Superexchange, or Kramers–Anderson superexchange, is the strong (usually) antiferromagnetic coupling between two next-to-nearest neighbour cations through a non-magnetic anion. In this way, it differs from direct exchange, in which there is coupling between nearest neighbor cations not involving an intermediary anion. Superexchange is a result of the electrons having come from the same donor atom and being coupled with the receiving ions' spins. If the two next-to-nearest neighbor positive ions are connected at 90 degrees to the bridging non-magnetic anion, then the interaction can be a ferromagnetic interaction.

Superexchange was proposed by Hendrik Kramers in 1934, when he noticed that in crystals like MnO, there are Mn atoms that interact with one another despite having nonmagnetic oxygen atoms between them. Phillip Anderson later refined Kramers' model in 1950.

These rules, now referred to as the Goodenough–Kanamori rules, have proven highly successful in rationalizing the magnetic properties of a wide range of materials on a qualitative level. They are based on the symmetry relations and electron occupancy of the overlapping atomic orbitals (assuming the localized Heitler–London, or valence-bond, model is more representative of the chemical bonding than is the delocalized, or Hund–Mulliken–Bloch, model). Essentially, the Pauli exclusion principle dictates that between two magnetic ions with half-occupied orbitals, which couple through an intermediary non-magnetic ion (e.g. O2−), the superexchange will be strongly anti-ferromagnetic while the coupling between an ion with a filled orbital and one with a half-filled orbital will be ferromagnetic. The coupling between an ion with either a half-filled or filled orbital and one with a vacant orbital can be either antiferromagnetic or ferromagnetic, but generally favors ferromagnetic. When multiple types of interactions are present simultaneously, the antiferromagnetic one is generally dominant, since it is independent of the intra-atomic exchange term. For simple cases, the Goodenough–Kanamori rules readily allow the prediction of the net magnetic exchange expected for the coupling between ions. Complications begin to arise in various situations: 1) when direct exchange and superexchange mechanisms compete with one another; 2) when the cation–anion–cation bond angle deviates away from 180°; 3) when the electron occupancy of the orbitals is non-static, or dynamical; and 4) when spin–orbit coupling becomes important.

Double exchange is a related magnetic coupling interaction proposed by Clarence Zener to account for electrical transport properties. It differs from superexchange in the following manner: in superexchange, the occupancy of the d-shell of the two metal ions is the same or differs by two, and the electrons are localized. For other occupations (double exchange), the electrons are itinerant (delocalized); this results in the material displaying magnetic exchange coupling, as well as metallic conductivity.

Manganese oxide 

The p orbitals from oxygen and d orbitals from manganese can form a direct exchange.
There is antiferromagnetic order because the singlet state is energetically favoured. This configuration allows a delocalization of the involved electrons due to a lowering of the kinetic energy.

Quantum-mechanical perturbation theory results in an antiferromagnetic interaction of the spins of neighboring Mn atoms with the energy operator (Hamiltonian)

 

where tMn,O is the so-called hopping energy between a Mn 3d and the oxygen p orbitals, while U is a so-called Hubbard energy for Mn. The expression  is the scalar product between the Mn spin-vector operators (Heisenberg model).

References

External links 
 

Condensed matter physics
Magnetic exchange interactions